Lauren Gawne is a linguistics researcher and academic communicator, most known for her work on gestural languages and in the linguistics of emoji.

Early life and education 
Lauren Gawne was educated at the University of Melbourne, studying a BA in linguistics and art history and subsequently a linguistics PhD under the supervision of Barbara Kelly and Rachel Nordlinger which she received in 2013.

Career and impact 
After completing her PhD, Gawne worked at Nanyang Technological University and then the School of Oriental and African Studies. She subsequently took up fellowship in La Trobe University's department of languages and linguistics as a David Myers Research Fellow in 2017 and has worked there as a senior lecturer since 2019. During 2017-19, she was also vice president of the Australian Linguistic Society and was subsequently chair of the board of Living Languages in 2020. She also co-chaired the Research Data Alliance linguistics data interest group, developing best practices for research data management and data citation in the discipline.

Her research focuses on evidentiality and gesture, particularly in Tibeto-Burman languages such as Yolmo. She also researches the contemporary use of emojis and comments on the gestural elements of English speakers.

She is additionally active in academic outreach via writing for The Big Issue, running a linguistics website, and running the Lingthusiasm podcast series, which she co-hosts with Gretchen McCulloch.

Awards and honours 
Lauren Gawne received the 2014 Talkey award from the Australian Linguistics Society for her work on academic outreach.

References 

Created via preloaddraft
Linguists from Australia
Academic staff of La Trobe University
Living people
University of Melbourne alumni
Women linguists
Australian women academics
Year of birth missing (living people)